Jost Haller was a 15th-century Gothic painter from Alsace, active in the years 1440–1470, first established in Strasbourg, then in Metz, and in Saarbrücken. He is also called The painter of the knights [not "The painter of knights", or Le peintre de chevaliers].

A bridge in Strasbourg, built 2006, is named after Jost Haller.

See also 
Hans Hirtz, active in Strasbourg at the same time
Master of the Drapery Studies, probable disciple of the former
Caspar Isenmann, Haller's colleague from Colmar

References 

Painters from Alsace
15th-century German painters
Gothic painters
Artists from Strasbourg
German male painters